Dear Louise is a 1972 French drama film directed by Philippe de Broca. It was entered into the 1972 Cannes Film Festival. In July 2021, the film was shown in the Cannes Classics section at the 2021 Cannes Film Festival.

Cast
 Jeanne Moreau as Louise
 Julian Negulesco as Luigi
 Didi Perego as Frédérique
 Yves Robert as Magnetto, le marchand de cycles
 Pippo Starnazza
 Lucienne Legrand as La logeuse
 Jenny Arasse
 Toni Arasse
 Luce Fabiole
 Jill Larson
 Louis Navarre

References

External links

1972 films
1972 drama films
Films scored by Georges Delerue
Films directed by Philippe de Broca
1970s French-language films
Films with screenplays by Jean-Loup Dabadie
French drama films
1970s French films